Jérémie Rodrigues (born 1 November 1980) is a former French professional footballer who played as a right defender.

Career
Rodrigues started his career playing for Besançon RC before signing a contract with Ligue 2 club FC Gueugnon in 2005. After representing US Boulogne and stints with clubs from Cyprus, Rodrigues relocated to Bulgaria in 2010.

Career statistics

References

External links

1986 births
Living people
French footballers
Racing Besançon players
FC Gueugnon players
US Boulogne players
AEL Limassol players
Nea Salamis Famagusta FC players
PFC Lokomotiv Plovdiv players
PFC CSKA Sofia players
FC Lokomotiv 1929 Sofia players
Ligue 2 players
Cypriot First Division players
First Professional Football League (Bulgaria) players
French expatriate footballers
Expatriate footballers in Cyprus
Expatriate footballers in Bulgaria
Association football defenders
People from Schiltigheim
Footballers from Alsace
Sportspeople from Bas-Rhin